BiFi is a brand of meat snacks owned by the American snack company Jack Link's. BiFi Roll (introduced in 1987) and BiFi Carazza (introduced in 1994) are the most popular BiFi products besides BiFi Original. Up to this day, the meat snacks are still manufactured in the original facilities of "Schafft Fleischwerke" in Ansbach, Germany.

History 
The brand BiFi was introduced in 1972. Originally, the name BiFi was only used for the first product of today's product range, a small salami. The name BiFi derived from the English adjective "beefy" (meaty). Currently more than ten products are distributed under the brand. 

After "Schafft Fleischwerke" became part of the "Union Deutsche Lebensmittelwerke GmbH" (Union of German Food factories Ltd.), BiFi was included in the Unilever product range. 

In February 2014, Unilever sold their meat snacks brands BiFi and Peperami to the largest meat snack producer worldwide, Jack Link's.  

In 2017, the brand's logo and packaging design was revised. The new look of the brand was introduced in the context by a large-scale TV and online campaign under the claim "It's right when it feels right".

Advertising & Varieties 
Like Peperami, BiFi's television advertising is humorous.

In the 1990s, BiFi used the advertisements at the time for Peperami, featuring the "Animal". However, Julien Haggége's German voice (for the Animal) was overdubbed with the German translations for the words, and the ending consequently features a BiFi packet, not a Peperami packet.

In 2001, BiFi "debuted" an advertising campaign featuring a supermarket/office area called Zomtec. There were ten adverts in the series, lasting even into 2003. They feature numerous characters and their "mishaps" with BiFi. One of the more famous ones (in English-language) featured a man "reach" for a BiFi, but someone else reaches for it first. Upset, other people offer him a BiFi, but it turns out to be a joke as one of the people offering him a BiFi licks the BiFi.

The following varieties are, or have been available: Original, XXL, Minis, Thin Sticks, Salamibrot, Beef, Wrapped in Dough (Turkey, Hot, Original, Veggie), Bierwurst, Turkey, Veggie Carazza.

See also
 Peperami (a similar snack also made by Jack Link's)

References

External links

 BiFi official website
Jack Link's website

Brand name snack foods
Brand name meats
Former Unilever brands
Products introduced in 1972